The 1953–54 season was the 44th season of competitive football in Germany.

National teams

West Germany national football team

1954 FIFA World Cup qualification

Group 1

1954 FIFA World Cup

Final

Friendly matches

League season

Oberliga Nord
The 1953–54 season saw two new clubs in the league, Eintracht Braunschweig and Victoria Hamburg, both promoted from the Amateurliga.

Oberliga Berlin
The 1953–54 season saw two new clubs in the league, Kickers 1900 Berlin and Hertha Zehlendorf, both promoted from the Amateurliga Berlin.

Oberliga West
The 1953–54 season saw two new clubs in the league, Rheydter SV and VfL Bochum, both promoted from the 2. Oberliga West.

Oberliga Südwest
The 1953–54 season saw two new clubs in the league, ASV Landau and VfR Frankenthal, both promoted from the 2. Oberliga Südwest.

Oberliga Süd
The 1953–54 season saw two new clubs in the league, Jahn Regensburg and KSV Hessen Kassel, both promoted from the 2. Oberliga Süd.

German championship

The 1954 German football championship was contested by the six qualified Oberliga teams and won by Hannover 96, defeating 1. FC Kaiserslautern in the final. The six clubs played single round of matches at neutral grounds in two groups of three. The two group winners then advanced to the final.

Group 1

Group 2

Final

DFB–Pokal

The 1953–54 DFB-Pokal consisted eight teams competing in three rounds of a knockout tournament.  VfB Stuttgart became champions by defeating 1. FC Köln 1–0 in the final.

Sources

 
Seasons in German football